Cats is a musical composed by Andrew Lloyd Webber, based on the 1939 poetry collection Old Possum's Book of Practical Cats by T. S. Eliot. It revolves around the Jellicle cat tribe during an important night, in which one cat is to be chosen to ascend to the Heaviside Layer and come back to a new life. The musical was produced by Cameron Mackintosh, directed by Trevor Nunn and choreographed by Gillian Lynne. 

Cats premiered at the New London Theatre in the West End in 1981, and ran for 21 years and almost 9,000 performances. The musical garnered six Laurence Olivier Awards nominations, winning two awards: Best New Musical and Outstanding Achievement in a Musical (Gillian Lynne).

In 1982, Cats opened at the Winter Garden Theatre on Broadway where it played for 18 years and 7,485 performances. This production received eleven Tony Award nominations, out of which it won seven: Best Musical, Best Book of a Musical (T. S. Eliot), Best Original Score (Andrew Lloyd Webber and T. S. Eliot), Best Performance by a Featured Actress in a Musical (Betty Buckley), Best Direction of a Musical (Trevor Nunn), Best Costume Design (John Napier), and Best Lighting Design (David Hersey). At the 1983 Drama Desk Awards, the musical was nominated for five awards. It won three, including Outstanding Costume Design, Outstanding Lighting Design and Outstanding Music. The Washington D.C production received three Helen Hayes nominations in 1985, winning Outstanding Lead Actress in a Touring Production for Diane Fratantoni. The Toronto production was nominated for seven Dora Mavor Moore Award and won all of them. In Paris, the French production of Cats won one Molière Award.

The London and Broadway cast recordings were both nominated for the Grammy Award for Best Musical Theater Album, which the latter won. The 2014 London revival was nominated for 2 Laurence Olivier Awards, including Best Musical Revival but won none. The 2016 Broadway revival starring Leona Lewis received six Chita Rivera nominations, one Drama Desk nomination as well as one Drama League nomination.

Original London production

Original Broadway production

North American productions

Australian productions

Paris productions

South African productions

2014 London revival

2016 Broadway revival

References

Cats
Awards and nominations